Feel the Night is an album by American guitarist Lee Ritenour released in 1979.

Track listing
"Feel the Night" - 5:32
"Market Place" - 5:22
"Wicked Wine" - 7:03
"French Roast" - 5:06
"You Make Me Feel Like Dancing" - 4:16
"Midnight Lady" - 5:57
"Uh Oh!" - 4:03

Personnel
 Lee Ritenour – electric guitar, acoustic guitar
 Ernie Watts – soprano saxophone, tenor saxophone
 David Foster – piano
 Dave Grusin – piano
 Joe Sample – piano
 Michael Boddicker - synthesizer
 Steve Lukather – rhythm guitar on "Wicked Wine" and "You Make Me Feel Like Dancing"
 Abraham Laboriel – bass guitar
 Steve Gadd – drums
 Alex Acuña – percussion
 Patti Austin – vocals

External links
Lee Ritenour - Feel the Night at Discogs
Lee Ritenour's Official Site

1979 albums
Lee Ritenour albums